Vulgar Video is the second home video (not counting the self released Hot 'n Heavy Home Vid) by American heavy metal band Pantera. It was released on VHS on November 16, 1993.

Content
Vulgar Video is a chronicle of Pantera's 1992 tour, behind the Vulgar Display of Power studio album, that shows all of the band's excesses with groupies, drinking and drugs, as well as backstage footage. It also contains a total of six music videos. Members of Alice in Chains, White Zombie, Megadeth, and Metallica make guest appearances. 

Vulgar Video, along with the two other home video releases of the band, was included on the 3 Vulgar Videos from Hell DVD in 2000 and then re-released in 2006 with better DVD features.

Track listing
"Walk"
"Domination" (live at the 1991 Monsters in Moscow festival)
"Primal Concrete Sledge" (live at the 1991 Monsters in Moscow festival)
"Cold Gin" (KISS cover, performed live with Skid Row)
"This Love"
"Mouth for War"

Personnel
Phil Anselmo – vocals
Rex Brown – bass
Dimebag Darrell – guitar
Vinnie Paul – drums

Certifications

See also
Pantera video albums

External links

References

Pantera albums
1993 video albums
1993 live albums
Live video albums
Music video compilation albums
1993 compilation albums